This is a list of slums. A slum as defined by the United Nations agency UN-Habitat, is a run-down area of a city characterized by substandard housing, squalor, and lacking in tenure security. According to the United Nations, the percentage of urban dwellers living in slums decreased from 47 percent to 37 percent in the developing world between 1990 and 2005. However, due to rising population, and the rise especially in urban populations, the number of slum dwellers is rising. One billion people worldwide live in slums and the figure is projected to grow to 2 billion by 2030.

Africa

Egypt
 Ezbet el-Haggana a slum in Cairo
 Manshiyat Naser slum in Cairo

Ghana

 Amui Djor
 Ashiaman
 Fadama
 Jamestown/Usshertown, Accra
 Kojokrom
 New Takoradi
 Suame Magazine
 Nima
 Agbogbloshie

Kenya 

 Baba Ndogo
 Dandora
 Fuata Nyayo
 Gatwekera
 Huruma
 Kambi Muru
 Kangemi
 Kawangware
 Kiambiu
 Kianda
 Kibera (Kibera has been described as the largest slum in Kenya)
 Kiamaiko
 Kichinjio
 Kisumu Ndogo
 Korogocho
 Laini Saba
 Lindi
 Majengo, Nairobi
 juakali-marurui, Nairobi
 Makongeni
 Mashimoni
 Matopeni
 Mathare
 Mathare Valley
 Mugumoini
 Mukuru kwa Njenga
 Mukuru slums
 Nyalenda
 Pumwani
 Raila
 Sarang'ombe
 Shilanga
 Siranga
 Soweto East
 Soweto West
 Ziwa la Ng'ombe
 Viwandani (Kenya)

Liberia
 Brewerville
 Clara Town, Bushrod Island
 Logan Town
 Sinkor
 Slipway
 Sonewein
 South Beach Bay
 West Point

Mauritania

 Arafat, Mauritania
 Dar-Naim
 El Mina, Mauritania
 Sebkha, Mauritania
 Toujouonine

Namibia

 Africa Tongashili
 Freedomland
 Goreangab
 Kahumba ka Ndola
 Okahandja Park
 Okandundu
 Okantunda
 Okuryangava
 One Nation N° 1
 One Nation N° 2
 Ongulumbashe N° 1
 Onyika
 Otjomuise
 Samuel Maherero

Nigeria

 Agege
 Ajegunle
 Amukoko
 Badia
 Bariga
 Bodija
 Ijeshatedo/Itire
 Ilaje
 Iwaya
 Makoko
 Mushin
 Oke-Offa Babasale
 Somolu
Idikan
Sasa

South Africa

 Alexandra
Cato Manor
Chatsworth 
Fisantekraal 
 Freedom Park
Gamalakhe 
Gugulethu 
Ibhayi 
 Inanda
 Joe Slovo Park
 Kennedy Road
Khayelitsha 
KwaDabeka 
KwaMakhutha  
KwaMashu 
KwaNobuhle  
Langa  
Lwandle  
Mdantsane  
Mitchells Plain  
Motherwell  
Nomzamo 
Ntuzuma  
Nyanga
Philippi 
Thembalethu 
 Wallacedene

Spain

 Barrio del Principe, Ceuta

Asia

Bangladesh

 Begun Bari
Bhola (Dhaka North)
City Palli (Dhaka South)
Driver Colony (Dhaka South)
Duaripara (Dhaka North)
Kawnia
Korail slum (Dhaka North)
Lalbagh (Slum)|Lalbagh
Mach Colony
Mannan (Dhaka South)
Mohammadpur (Slum)|Mohammadpur
Molla (Dhaka North)
Monsur Beel / Nama Para
Mymensingh (Slum)|Mymensingh
Nubur (Dhaka South)
Power House (Dhaka South)
Pura (Dhaka South) 
Rail Line Slums (most of the largest rail lines in Bangladesh have slums)

Hong Kong
Kowloon Walled City (demolished)

India

Kirti Nagar, Delhi, Delhi
Munirka, Delhi, Delhi
Kathputhli Colony, Delhi
Talkatora, Delhi
Pilkhana, Kolkata
Tikiapara, Kolkata
Basanti, Kolkata
Chandmari, Guwahati
Dharavi, Mumbai
Banganga, Mumbai
Baiganwadi, Mumbai
Antop Hill, Mumbai
Vyasarpadi, Chennai
Royapuram, Chennai
Thiruvotriyur, Chennai
Salia Sahi, Bhubaneswar

Pakistan

Parts of Machar Colony

Previous Slums in Pakistan

Orangi, previously but status changed to municipality from 2018 onward.

South Korea
 Guryong Village

Sri Lanka

 Usavi Watta (Usaui Walta)
 Wanathamulla

Turkey

Sultanbeyli, Istanbul
Çinçin, one of the most popular Turkish gecekondu (slum) located in Ankara
Hacıhüsrev, largest slum of İstanbul
Hürriyet mahallesi, Adana
Kadifekale, Izmir
Horozköy, Manisa

Yemen
 Mahwa Aser

Oceania

Australia
 Little Lon district In the nineteenth century the area consisted of timber and brick cottages, shops and small factories and was home to an ethnically diverse and generally poor population. Today there are few reminders of the area's former notoriety.

Europe (formerly)
The following are former slum areas that have subsequently been either gradually developed or abruptly cleared and demolished.

Bulgaria 

 Fakulteta, Sofia
 Filipovtsi, Sofia
 Hristo Botev, Sofia

 Stolipinovo, Plovdiv
 Sheker Mahala, Plovdiv
 Hadji Hasan Mahala, Plovdiv
 Arman Mahala, Plovdiv
 Maksuda, Varna

Greece
Agia Kyriaki, Acharnes, Athens

Ano Liosia, Athens

Dendropotamos, Thessaloniki

Kountiuriotika, Athens

Nea zoi, Aspropyrgos, Attica

Neos Kosmos, Athens

Perama, Piraeus

Italy
Fondo Fucile in Messina
Maregrosso in Messina
Rione Taormina in Messina
Santa Lucia sopra Contesse in Messina
Giostra in Messina
Ciambra in Gioia Tauro
Arghillà in Reggio Calabria
Ciampa di Cavallo in Lamezia Terme
Germaneto in Catanzaro
Acquabona in Crotone
Via degli Stadi in Cosenza
Timpone Rosso in Cassano allo Ionio
Scampia in Naples
Ponticelli in Naples

Malta

 The Manderaggio, an area in Valletta that was a slum area from the 16th to 20th centuries. It was demolished in the 1950s and replaced by housing estates.

Spain 
 Las Barranquillas, Madrid
 Valdemíngomez, Madrid

Portugal 
 Cova da Moura, Amadora, Lisbon
 Fontainhas, Amadora, Lisbon
 Venda Nova, Amadora, Lisbon
 Bairro da Jamaica, Amora, Seixal

Serbia 

 Cardboard city in Belgrade, depopulated and demolished starting on 31 August 2009, following four years of unsuccessful attempts.

North America

Bahamas
 Over The Hill it is the largest and most populous of the Bahamas with about 2.5 km2

Haiti
 Cité Soleil

Jamaica
 Trenchtown
 Mountain Bay
 Vikia

Mexico
 Neza-Chalco-Ixta in Mexico City, is a Ciudad Perdida, rated as the world's largest mega-slum in 2006. The area extends towards the municipalities of Chimalhuacan, Los Reyes to the west of Ixtapaluca and South of Neza and Ecatepec de Morelos north of Neza in the metropolitan area periphery and with Santa Marta Acatitla in the Distrito Federal's borough of Iztapalapa.

Puerto Rico
 La Perla, San Juan

South America

Argentina

In Buenos Aires:
Villa 21-24
Villa 26
Villa 31
Villa 1-11-14
Villa Zabaleta
Villa Rodrigo Bueno

Brazil

Shanty towns in Brazil are referred to as favelas.

 Vila Parisi

 Cidade de Deus
 Complexo do Alemão
 Santa Marta
 Jacarezinho
 Mangueira
 Manguinhos
 Morro da Babilônia
 Rocinha
 Serrinha
 Vidigal
 Vigário Geral
 Heliópolis
 Paraisópolis
 Ilha das Cobras

Colombia

 Ciudad Bolívar (Bogotá)
 Siloé (Cali)

Paraguay
Bañados del Río Paraguay

Peru

Pueblos jóvenes is the nickname given to the vast shanty towns that surround Lima and other cities of Peru. Many of these towns have developed into significant districts in Lima such as Villa El Salvador and Comas District, Lima.
 Comas
 Villa El Salvador
 San Juan de Lurigancho
 Cono Sur

Uruguay

Presidente Kennedy, Punta del Este

Venezuela

 Miguel Peña Parish
 Libertador Bolivarian Municipality in Caracas

See also

 Campamento (Chile) a term in Chile to shanty towns.
 Chengzhongcun less prosperous areas in urban areas in China.
 Cortiço a Portuguese term commonly used in Brazil and Portugal to describe an area of urban housing where many people live in conditions of poor hygiene and poverty.
 Rugby boy a common group or gang of street children seen in the Philippines, they are one of the most well known and recognized poverty inflicted people found in the slums of the Philippines.
 Slum upgrading consists of physical, social, economic, organizational and environmental improvements to slums undertaken cooperatively and locally among citizens, community groups, businesses and local authorities.
 Villa miseria a type of shanty town or slum found in Argentina

References

External links

Lists of places